Banque Misr is an Egyptian bank co-founded by industrialist Joseph Aslan Cattaui Pasha and economist Talaat Harb Pasha in 1920. The government of the United Arab Republic nationalized the bank in 1960. The bank has branch offices in all of Egypt's governorates, and currency exchange and work permit offices for foreign workers in Egypt.

History 

The idea of a national bank of Egypt dates to at least the days of Muhammad Ali, who ordered the establishment of a bank with 700,000 riyals shortly before he became ill and died. Amin Shumayyil wrote an article in favor of the idea in April 26, 1879 in the newspaper Al-Tijara; although a number of Egyptian dignitaries met to discuss the project, the conflict between the Khedive Isma'il Pasha and the National Assembly and subsequent ʻUrabi revolt doomed the idea this time. Revolt leader Ahmed ʻUrabi’s friend Wilfrid Scawen Blunt reports in his memoirs that Urabi had envisioned a “credit bank” for farmers.

Omar Lotfi Bey, a member of the Watani Party and Vice-President of the School of Law (now part of Cairo University) revived the idea in lectures at the Universities’ Club beginning on November 1, 1908, but his suggestions of using German and Italian assistance and credit were politically controversial.

Joseph Cattaui and Talaat Harb co-founded Banque Misr in 1920. Talaat had published books in 1907 and 1911 calling for the founding of a national bank with Egyptian financing. (The National Bank of Egypt was British-owned, and all the other banks in Egypt were owned by foreigners.) Harb modeled Bank Misr's operations on those of Deutsche Orientbank with which he was familiar due to his friendship with the owner of a Sephardi Jewish bank, Banque Suarès. Harb established Banque Misr and its companies on the basis of certain concepts: all its dealings were in Arabic, Egyptians operated the bank, and the bank restricted share ownership to Egyptian citizens. Misr's Board of Directors included a number of Sephardic Jews and a Coptic Christian. 
  
In 1926-1927 Banque Misr established its first foreign subsidiary, Banque Misr-France, to serve Egyptian tourists to France. Its Paris office was on 101-103 rue des Petits-Champs, now 33-35 rue Danielle Casanova, with registered address across the block on 24 Place Vendôme. Four years later, Bank Misr joined with Banque Essadine, in Lebanon, to form the joint-venture Banque Misr-Syrie-Liban. This bank then absorbed Banque Ezzeddine & Adib (Izz al-Din) in Tripoli.

Banque Misr failed in 1939, but was then reorganized.

In 1960 Gamal Nasser nationalised all banks in Egypt, foreign and domestic, including the four largest domestic banks — National Bank of Egypt, Banque Misr, Bank of Alexandria and Banque du Caire. The next year, Syria nationalized all banks operating in the country, including Banque Misr's operations there.

 1963 In Libya, Banque Misr created Nahda Arabian Bank to hold its branches there.
 1971 Banque Misr absorbed Banque de Port-Said. Banque de Port-Said had been created in 1960 to hold the Egyptian operations of several foreign bank, including Ionian Bank, Ottoman Bank, Banque Belge et Internationale en Egypte and Bank of Tokyo.  
 1975 Liberalization of foreign entry led several Egyptian banks to establish joint venture banks with foreign banks.  
 1976 Banque Misr established Misr International Bank (MIBank) with Banque Misr owning 44%, First Chicago 20%, Europartners 10.5%, UBAF Bank 8.5%, Banco di Roma 7.375%, and Mitsui Bank 2.625%. 
 Misr established Misr American International Bank (MAIB) with Bank of America. 
 Misr established Misr Exterior Bank in a joint venture with Banco Exterior de España. 
 1977 Bank MISR established Misr Romanian Bank, together with a number of Romanian banks. Misr initially owned 51%, with Banca Romana de Comert Exterior owning 19%, and other Romanian banks such as Banca Agricola and Banca Comerciala Romana owning the rest. 
 1988 Banque de Caire took a 17% in MIBank, and Misr took over First Chicago's 20% stake. 
 1995 Banque Misr joined with Bank of Alexandria, National Bank of Egypt, Banque du Caire and Kato Aromatics to found Cairo International Bank in Uganda.
 1996 MIBank sold 10% of its shares to the Egyptian public in an initial public offering.  The remaining shareholders were Misr with some 55%, Banca di Roma International (10%), British Arab Commercial Bank (8.5%), Commerzbank and Banco Central Hispano Americano (jointly 7.875%) and Sakura Bank (2.625%). 
 2004 Banque Misr merged in Misr Exterior Bank. 
 2005 National Société Générale Bank (NSGB), a joint venture between National Bank of Egypt and France's Société Générale, acquired a majority stake in Misr International Bank (MIBank), making NSGB Egypt's biggest private sector bank.  Arab African International Bank (AAIB) acquired Misr America International Bank (MAIB). Lebanon's Blom Bank increased its stake in Romanian-Egyptian joint venture Misr Romania Bank to 97% by purchasing an 84% stake.

Services

Investment finance
The General Investment Funds Administration was founded in 1994 to expand the bank’s offerings with an eye toward flexibility and low costs. Banque Misr manages individual, corporate, and institutional investments both on the long and short terms. Eight investments funds are offered, each with their own investment strategy, earning a regional prize two years in a row.
 First Fund
 Second Fund (growth capital)
 Third Fund (cumulative return and periodic distribution)
 Fourth Fund (by sharia with the help of Al-Hosn Fund)
 Omar Fund (accumulative investment with life insurance and capital guarantee)

Venture capital
 Establishes projects on behalf of clients, obtains official approvals and licenses, prepares incorporation contracts as well as articles of association and by-laws, takes the month-long procedure, publishes and registers
 Organizes underwriting for new projects
 Builds the share capital of existing companies, ends their procedures, and issues certificates of deposit
 Issues bonds for corporations and organizations
 Liquidates companies and handles related financial, legal, and tax procedures 
 Registers companies’ shares as a custodian bank
 Appraising companies’ assets and extracting their fair share price with specialized expert offices

Real estate
 Buying and selling real estate and farmland on behalf of clients
 Auctioning off all kinds of real estate
 Brokering residential and administrative properties for clients 
 Promoting industrial and tourist projects, residential and administrative units, villas, resorts, and amusement parks, along with conventional direct buyer-seller transactions

Portfolio management
 Providing technical advice and expertise to help establish projects
 Paying periodic obligations on clients’ behalf to government agencies and creditors
 Liquidating inheritances in Egypt and abroad and dividing among the heirs

Other services
 Preparing economic feasibility studies for clients’ project in specialized expert offices
 Preparing for exhibitions, seminars, and national and international conferences
 Other non-traditional services

Telephone banking
Banque Misr provides telephone banking over the number 19888, with complete confidentiality using a passcode and a serial number for each account; supplying these yields the balance and the last five transactions.

Banque Misr Wallet
In March 2017, Banque Misr launched its online banking services for electronic payment over a mobile phone. The Wallet can be used to deposit and withdraw money in accounts, transfer from one enabled account to another, pay utility bills, charge companies’ balance, donate, pay fines, receive wire transfers, and pay for purchases from approved merchants.

Areas served
 Boasting a unique global presence, Banque Misr has pioneered the latest banking innovations nationally and includes one of the largest computer centers in the Middle East linking its 626 branches and 2,516 ATMs throughout the country. From 2005 to 2009, the company built its network between branches. By the end of this timeframe, the company had 32 affiliated Islamic banking branches. The largest credit card issuer in Egypt, it is also the first bank in the country to provide contactless payment.
 United Arab Emirates: Established in 1974 as Banque du Caire, the division’s name was changed in 2008 to match the main bank. There are 5 branches in the Emirates.
 Lebanon: Banque Misr is one of the oldest banks active in Lebanon, founded in 1929, and has 18 branches throughout the country with capital of £L100 billion.
 France
 Germany
 Saudi Arabia: On April 6, 2021, the Saudi Cabinet licensed Banque Misr to open a branch in the Kingdom.

References

External links 

 

1920 establishments in Egypt
Banks established in 1920
Banks of Egypt
Companies based in Cairo
Egyptian brands
Government-owned companies of Egypt
Government-owned banks